Mariabad is an inner eastern suburb of Quetta, capital of Pakistan's Balochistan province. It is the most populous area of Quetta with almost 500,000 population. Most of the population are Hazara people.  This place is the birthplace of many Hazara political, social, military, writers, sports personalities of Quetta city. It is quite famous for its cleanliness compared to other places around it.

History of Hazaras establishment in Balochistan 
The first contact between the British and the Hazaras was just before the First Afghan War, when some Hazaras served in "Broadfoot's Sappers" (British Scouts) from 1839–1840. This sappers company participated in the First Anglo-Afghan War also . Hazaras also worked in the agriculture farms in Sindh and construction of Sukkur barrage . In his seminal book War and Migration, Alessandro Monsutti classifies the Hazara migration to Balochistan in the following phases:

1878–91
Following the Second Anglo-Afghan War, the first Hazaras came to Quetta to seek employment in British-run companies under the Raj. They are thought to have worked on the building of roads and the Bolan Pass railway as well as enlisting in the British Army of India. At that time, there could have been no more than a few hundred Hazaras in Balochistan.

1891–1901
The subjugation of Hazarajat by Abdur Rahman, between 1891 and 1893, triggered a mass exodus of Hazaras to Turkestan, Khorasan and Balochistan.

1901–33
The situation in Afghanistan returned to normal under Habibullah (1901–1919), the son of Abdur Rahman. He offered amnesty to the Hazaras but this proved to be of little help in improving the lot of the Hazara community in Afghanistan.  In 1904, the 106th Hazara Pioneers, a separate regiment for the Hazaras formed by the British, offered greater careers prospects, social recognition and economic success.

1933–71
The regiment of Hazara Pioneers was disbanded in 1933. Deprived of this social and professional outlet, Hazaras went to settle in Quetta between the 1930s and 1960s, although the process of migration never completely dried up.

1971–78
Following the 1971 drought, Hazaras then settled in Quetta or went to Iran in search of work. Between 1973 and 1978, tensions over the Pashtunistan issue between Pakistan and the Afghan regime, were an additional factor in the Hazara migration since President Daoud Khan of Afghanistan saw the Hazara as Pakistan's allies.

After 1978
Following the Communist coup in April 1978 and the Soviet Union intervention in December 1979, the migratory movement assumed hitherto unprecedented dimensions.

See also
 Hazara Town
 Hazara Democratic Party
 Persecution of Hazara people in Quetta
 General Mohammad Musa Khan Hazara

References

Populated places in Quetta District
Hazara communities in Pakistan